Harry William Waters (born 16 November 1976) is a British piano and Hammond organ player, associated with progressive rock and jazz.

Life
Waters is the son of former Pink Floyd bass player, songwriter, and lyricist Roger Waters and his second wife Lady Carolyne Christie, the niece of the 3rd Marquess of Zetland.

He is married to visual artist Richelle Rich. They reside in Los Angeles.

Musical career
Waters is heard at the age of 2 in the original recording of "Goodbye Blue Sky" on Pink Floyd's 1979 album The Wall. The song opens with him saying "Look, mummy, there's an aeroplane up in the sky" before the song starts.

Waters has played on tour with his father since 2002, replacing keyboardist Jon Carin on the In the Flesh tour, and later playing alongside Carin since The Dark Side of the Moon Live in 2006.

In 2004 he toured with Marianne Faithfull and Ozric Tentacles. He is a fan of Phish and The Grateful Dead and has played in several jam band cover bands.

Waters is also a jazz musician who has teamed with the likes of Ian Ritchie (saxophone player for Roger Waters), forming the Harry Waters Quartet. Some demos of his jazz work are available to download from Waters's official website.

In November 2008 the first Harry Waters Band album was released.

On 19 June 2011 Waters played a Pink Floyd song, "In the Flesh" (from The Wall), with Primus during the band's concert at the Effenaar in Eindhoven.

On 17 September 2015 Dean Ween announced on his Facebook page that Harry Waters was the new keyboard player of his namesake group, Dean Ween Band.

He is a member of the band McNally Waters with singer-songwriter Larry John McNally. He has scored for TV and film.

Discography

 Harry Waters Band (2008)
McNally Waters (2018)
Bang Bang (2021)

Film scores

 More Human Than Human
The Birth of the Cobra
The Halcyon
The Look
Proxy
Retrospekt

TV Work

Comedians in Cars Getting Coffee
Baywatch
At Home With Amy Sedaris
Stage Mother
Lose a Stone in 21 Days
Chelsea
The Beauty Inside
The Way Home
Himalaya with Michael Palin

Video Games

Pirate Pop - Nintendo

Harry Waters Band 
The lineup is as follows:
Harry Waters: Piano
Yarron Stavi: Bass
Seb Rochford: Drums
Roger Beaujolais: Vibraphone
Ian Ritchie: Tenor Saxophone
Alan Barnes: Alto/Baritone Saxophone, Clarinet
Quentin Collins: Trumpet

References

External links 
 Official site and blog
 Information on tour with Marianne Faithfull

Living people
English keyboardists
1976 births
Roger Waters